Sir Francis Knollys (c. 1552 – 1648) of Reading Abbey, Berkshire was an English privateer and politician who sat in the House of Commons at various times between 1575 and 1648.

Life
Knollys was the 6th son of Sir Francis Knollys, of Greys Court in Oxfordshire and Reading Abbey, Reading, in Berkshire, and his wife, Catherine Carey and was generally known as Francis Knollys the younger. He attended Magdalen College, Oxford in and around 1564. He was a student of Gray's Inn in 1565.

In December 1575 Knollys was elected Member of Parliament for Oxford following the death of Edward Knollys, and held the seat unit 1589. In those early years he was involved in piracy with Sir Francis Drake, serving as a rear-admiral on privateering activities in the Caribbean, returning in 1586 with considerable booty. He soon after served with his brother-in-law, the Earl of Leicester, in the Netherlands campaign and was knighted by him at Flushing on 7 December 1587.

Knollys was once again elected MP in 1597, this time for Berkshire. He was awarded MA at Oxford on 10 July 1598. In 1604 he was re-elected MP for Berkshire and sat until 1611. He was elected MP for Berkshire again in 1625. In April 1640, Knollys was re-elected MP for Reading in the Short Parliament with his son, and was re-elected for the Long Parliament in November 1640. He sat until his death in 1648.

Knollys died before May 1648 at the age of about 95, described by his colleagues as "the ancientest Parliament man in England". He was one of the oldest ever members of parliament and has the record for the longest span of service as an MP, 73 years between first being elected and his death. He was buried at St Laurence's Church, Reading. He had married in 1588 Lettice Barrett, daughter of John Barrett, of Hanham in Gloucestershire. 

Knollys had three sons and six daughters, amongst them Robert, MP, who predeceased him in 1626, Francis, who predeceased him in 1643  Richard and Lettice, who married the parliamentarian, John Hampden.

Ancestry

References

 
 
 
 

English privateers
English admirals
Francis
17th-century Royal Navy personnel
1648 deaths
People of the Elizabethan era
Members of the Parliament of England for Berkshire
People from Reading, Berkshire
People from Rotherfield Greys
Members of the Parliament of England (pre-1707) for Reading
English MPs 1572–1583
English MPs 1584–1585
English MPs 1586–1587
English MPs 1589
English MPs 1597–1598
English MPs 1604–1611
English MPs 1625
English MPs 1640 (April)
English MPs 1640–1648
Year of birth uncertain
Military personnel from Reading, Berkshire